Two Birds (lit. little birds) is a 2008 Icelandic short film, written and directed by Rúnar Rúnarsson. The firm premiered at the 2008 Cannes Film Festival, where the film was nominated for a Palme d'Or. In the two years after its release it received over 67 international awards at film festivals where it was exhibited, including two Best Actor awards for male lead Atli Óskar Fjalarsson.

Synopsis
The film takes place during one bright summer night and follows a group of young teenagers on a journey from innocence to adulthood. The main character is a timid boy who has a typical schoolboy crush on a girl his age who happens to be a friend of his mate.

Cast
 Hera Hilmar
 Atli Óskar Fjalarsson
 Sigurður Jakob Helgason
 Þórunn Jakobsdóttir
 Gísli Örn Garðarsson
 Víkingur Kristjánsson
 Ómar Örn Hauksson

Critical reception
The website Short of the Week describes Two Birds as "...perhaps the purest and most earnest 15 minutes of film I have ever experienced".

Other honors 
 Nominated for Best Short Film at the 2008 European Film Awards
 Nominated for the Palme d'Or at the 2008 Cannes Film Festival

References

External links
 Official website
 

2008 films
Films directed by Rúnar Rúnarsson
Icelandic short films
2008 short films